Józef Ignacy Kałuża (11 February 1896 – 11 October 1944) was a Polish footballer and later coach, was one of the legends of Polish sports.

Club career 
Kałuża was one of the most experienced forward players of 1920s Poland. His whole career was connected with Cracovia - with this team in 1921 he won the first, historic Championships of Poland. By 1921, Kałuża had scored 297 goals in 200 games.  Altogether, he played 408 games in Cracovia’s jersey, scoring 465 goals. Also, in the years 1921-1928 Kałuża represented Poland in various international games, scoring 7 goals.

Career statistics

Later life 
In 1932, after retirement from playing, he became a trainer/manager of the Polish National Team. Directed by him, Poland slowly began to achieve successes on an international scale. In 1936, during Berlin's Olympic Games, the white-red placed 4th (some claim that had Ernest Wilimowski gone to Berlin, the Poles would have won gold). Two years later, during the FIFA World Cup 1938, Poland, after a fierce battle, lost to Brazil 5-6. This legendary game is to this day not only regarded as one of the best in the history of Polish football, but also as one of the best in all of World Cup history.

Kałuża's last game as coach took place on Sunday 27 August 1939 in Warsaw. Poland, after a very good game, beat the then vice-champions of the world, Hungary, 4-2. It was the last game of interwar Poland - on 1 September 1939, Germany invaded Poland and World War II started.

During the war, Kałuża, as one of the few officials of the Polish Football Federation (PZPN), remained in his homeland, where he died in 1944. In 1946, to commemorate him, PZPN begun organizing Józef Kałuża's Cup, but after a few years this idea was given up. Józef Piłsudski's Cracovia Stadium is located on Kałuża's street.

See also 
Polish Roster in 1938 World Cup in France
The last game: August 27, 1939. Poland - Hungary 4-2

References

1896 births
1944 deaths
Polish footballers
Poland international footballers
Olympic footballers of Poland
Footballers at the 1924 Summer Olympics
Polish football managers
Poland national football team managers
1938 FIFA World Cup managers
MKS Cracovia (football) players
MKS Cracovia managers
Legia Warsaw managers
People from Przemyśl
Sportspeople from Podkarpackie Voivodeship
Association football forwards
Polish Austro-Hungarians
People from the Kingdom of Galicia and Lodomeria